The Diego Ramírez Islands are a small group of subantarctic islands located in the southernmost extreme of Chile.

History
The islands were first sighted on 12 February 1619 by the Spanish Garcia de Nodal expedition, and named after the cosmographer of the expedition, Diego Ramírez de Arellano. They were cited as the southernmost land mass plotted as of that time, and retained the distinction for 156 years, until the discovery of the South Sandwich Islands in 1775.

In 1892, the Chilean government rented the islands to Pedro Pablo Benavides for fishing and on condition that a lighthouse, a port, and a school would be built. Later the rent was transferred to Koenigswerther and Pasinowich.

The Chilean Navy established a meteorological station above Caleta Condell, a small cove on the northeastern side of Isla Gonzalo (Gonzalo Island), in 1957, and resupplies it several times each year. This is the southernmost inhabited outpost outside Antarctica. The next most southerly inhabited outpost is the lighthouse of Cape Horn. Cruise ships occasionally pass by on their way to and from Antarctica.

Geography

The two largest islands, Isla Bartolomé and Isla Gonzalo, both lie in the southern group. Águila Islet (Islote Águila), the southernmost land of the group, is at latitude and longitude coordinates 56°32'9"S. They lie about 350 km north of Sars Bank, a seamount that once may have been an island.



Climate
The islands have a tundra climate (ET) with abundant precipitation. Temperatures remain chilly to cool throughout the entire year.

Environment

Important Bird Area
The islands have been designated as an Important Bird Area (IBA) by BirdLife International for their significant seabird breeding populations. These include colonies of macaroni and southern rockhopper penguins, grey-headed and black-browed albatrosses, and blue petrels.

In 2022, Ricardo Rozzi et al. identified the Subantarctic rayadito (Aphrastura subantarctica) as a new bird species endemic to the Diego Ramírez Islands. Subantarctic rayadito individuals had been formerly idenfitied as belonging to the species Aphrastura spinicauda (thorn-tailed rayadito).

See also
 Ramírez Island

References

External links
 Chart of the islands made by Beagle expedition

 
Islands of Magallanes Region
Archipelagoes of the Pacific Ocean
Archipelagoes of Chile
Lighthouses in Chile
Important Bird Areas of Chile
Important Bird Areas of subantarctic islands
Seabird colonies
Penguin colonies